Deutschland 86 is a 2018 German  television series starring Jonas Nay as an agent of East Germany in 1986, in relation to the Angolan Civil War.

It is a sequel to the 2015 series Deutschland 83 and precedes the 2020 series Deutschland 89.

Cast

Main
 Jonas Nay as Martin Rauch, a former border patrol guard from East Germany who went undercover in 1983 in West Germany, an operation which prevented a pre-emptive nuclear strike by the Soviets against NATO but forced him to go into hiding.
 Maria Schrader as Lenora Rauch, Martin's aunt and former handler for the Stasi, now operating in Cape Town.
 Florence Kasumba as Rose Seithathi, an African National Congress (ANC) operative working with Lenora.
 Sylvester Groth as Walter Schweppenstette, Lenora's former boss at the East German Permanent Mission (StäV), and Martin's anonymous father, who has been demoted after the 1983 incident.
 Sonja Gerhardt as Annett Schneider, Martin's former fiancée who is now a junior intelligence agent in the inner circle of the East German StäV.
 Lavinia Wilson as Brigitte Winkelmann, dentist wife of the West German Trade Commissioner and a West German Intelligence Service (BND) officer.
 Ludwig Trepte as Alex Edel, a gay West German who served as Oberleutnant in the military with Martin in Deutschland 83 before being dismissed. Now works in an AIDS hospice with Tim.
 Alexander Beyer as Tobias Tischbier, Martin's former handler from the Stasi's foreign arm, the Main Directorate for Reconnaissance (HVA), who is now a member of Parliament for the Alternative Party.
 Fritzi Haberlandt as Tina Fischer, an East German doctor whose novelist brother, Thomas Posimski, defected to West Germany.
 Chris Veres as Tim, a closeted gay American G.I. who works with Alex at an AIDS hospice.

Recurring
 Vladimir Burlakov as Thomas Posimski, Annett's former lover and Tina's brother.
 Anke Engelke as Barbara Dietrich, a new financial consultant to the StäV.
 Uwe Preuss as Markus Fuchs, Walter's associate who was promoted to Walter's position at the StäV.
 Carina Wiese as Ingrid Rauch, Martin's mother
 Michaela Caspar as Mrs. Netz, the former secretary to Alex's father in the Bundeswehr, now working as an agent for the BND.
 Jonathan Pienaar as Gary Banks, a South African mercenary, hired by Lenora and Martin.
 Philipp Hochmair as Frank Winkelmann, the husband of Brigitte Winkelmann.

Episodes

There are 10 episodes. In addition, a documentary entitled "Comrades and Cash" was produced to accompany the series. Narrated by Nay, it describes various business activities undertaken by the East German state to earn hard currency, including: the sale of arms by the East German state to the apartheid government of South Africa, their notional enemies; smuggling arms to both sides in the Iran-Iraq war; forced labor in prisons; appropriating antiques and safe-deposit-box contents from its citizens and selling them abroad; selling blood abroad without testing it for HIV.

Broadcast 
Deutschland 86 first aired in Germany on Amazon Prime on 19 October 2018. The series premiered in Australia on Stan on 22 October 2018, and in the United States on 25 October 2018 on SundanceTV. It aired in the UK on More4 starting on 8 March 2019 and the boxset was released on Walter Presents on All 4 directly after its transmission.

Production
In August 2017, filming began in Cape Town, South Africa, with the majority of the returning cast from Deutschland 83 and five new cast members being confirmed, and concluded there in October before returning to Berlin. On 18 December 2017, both star Jonas Nay and co-creator Anna Winger confirmed on Twitter that it was the final day of filming on the series  with filming wrapping four days later. New cast member Chris Veres was promoted to series regular in November 2017. On 26 July 2018, Nay revealed the German premiere date on Instagram. Two days later, the US premiere date was revealed on the show's official Facebook and Instagram accounts.

Reception
The Guardian described the series as "geopolitically fascinating".

References

External links
 

German-language television shows
2018 German television series debuts
Angolan Civil War in fiction
RTL (German TV channel) original programming
Television series set in 1986
Television series about the Cold War
Television shows set in Germany
Espionage television series
1986 in Germany
Television series set in East Germany
Works about West Germany
Works about the Stasi
German drama television series